Shaandaar is a 1974 Indian Hindi-language drama film directed by Krishnan–Panju. The film stars Sanjeev Kumar, Sharmila Tagore and Vinod Mehra. A remake of the 1971 Kannada film Kasturi Nivasa, it focuses on Rajan, who incurs losses as Chander, a man who he helped, prospers. The film was released on 22 September 1974.

Plot 
Rajan, the owner of a matchbox factory called "Dove", lives in a huge house named Laxmi Bhavan. (Thus, he has a pet Dove) Rajan is a widower. Recognising that his honest employee Chander is in a similar position, he decides to help Chander financially. As Chander attends training in the U.S., Rajan suggests his secretary, Pratima, whom he has a crush on, to look after his daughter Rani. Rani starts to believing Pratima to be her mother which lead to Pratima and Chander to marry, making Rajan disheartened as he wanted to marry her.

Chander suggests changing the company's structure. The traditionalist Rajan becomes infuriated. Protesting this, Chander resigns and starts his own matchbox company, Eagle and becomes the leading matchbox manufacturer. This begins Rajan's downfall, his charity and donating activities have eaten up profit and ends up putting his house on sale. Chander calls for the highest bid and wants to give it back to Rajan, but being the man that he is, Rajan would not accept. Thus, Chander and Pratima shift to Laxmi Bhavan. Later, Pratima gives birth to Munna. Munna likes playing with Rajan's dove.

Due to Rajan's loss, Pratima shows her sympathy to him, much to Chander's dismay which leads him to become addicted to drugs. He starts drinking alcohol and thus join lavish parties. Meanwhile, Rani falls off the staircase and dies making Rajan crestfallen. Later, Munna becomes sick, and wants to play with Rajan's dove. Thus, Pratima requests for the dove (But Rajan sold the dove for feeding Pratima when she comes to his house). Rajan fails to confess the former and breathes his last.

Cast 
 Sanjeev Kumar as Rajan
 Sharmila Tagore as Pratima
 Vinod Mehra as Chander
 Aruna Irani as Chandni

Production 
The remake, titled Shaandaar, was produced by K. V. V. Arthanari Chettiar of A.V.A. Cine Corporation, with Krishnan–Panju directing. Cinematography was handled by S. Maruti Rao, and the dialogues were written by Rajinder Krishan.

Themes 
The film stresses the principle that "life is to give—not to take".

Soundtrack 
The soundtrack was composed by Laxmikant–Pyarelal, while the songs are written by Rajendra Krishan. The Christmas-themed number, "Aata Hai Aata Hai Santaclauz", attained popularity.

Release 
Shaandaar was released on 22 September 1974, and failed to match the success of the original.

References

External links 
 

1970s Hindi-language films
1974 drama films
1974 films
Films directed by Krishnan–Panju
Films scored by Laxmikant–Pyarelal
Hindi remakes of Kannada films
Hindi-language drama films
Indian drama films